Saldula is a genus of shore bugs in the family Saldidae. There are at least 120 described species in Saldula.

See also
 List of Saldula species

References

Further reading

External links

 

Articles created by Qbugbot
Heteroptera genera
Saldoidini